K. R. Narayanan National Institute of Visual Science and Arts (KRNNIVSA) is an autonomous institute established by the Government of Kerala at Thekkumthala, Chengalam East Village in Kottayam District of Kerala state as a training-cum-research centre in film/audio-visual technology. The institute, named after K. R. Narayanan who was the President of India during 1997 - 2002, was inaugurated by Hamid Ansari, Vice President of India, on 11 January 2016. The Institute is managed by a Governing Council which has Chief Minister of Kerala as Chairman and Minister for Education, Kerala State,  as Co-Chairman and  twelve members. There is also an Academic Council consisting of people for the film and television industry.

Courses
The institute offers two-year full-time Post Graduate Diploma programmes in;
 Script Writing & direction,
 Cinematography, 
 Editing,
 Audiography,
 Animation and Visual Effects
Diploma programmes in;

 Acting

Facilities 
 Shooting Floor
 Library
 Classroom Theatres
 The Boys & Girls Hostels 
 DI suite with DaVinci Resolve Panel & Dolby reference monitor.

See also 
 Cinema of India
 Film and Television Institute of India
 Satyajit Ray Film and Television Institute
 State Institute of Film and Television
 Government Film and Television Institute
 M.G.R. Government Film and Television Training Institute
 Jyoti Chitraban Film and Television Institute
 Biju Patnaik Film and Television Institute of Odisha
 Film School
 List of film schools

References

External links
 Official website: https://www.krnnivsa.com/

Universities and colleges in Kottayam
Film schools in India
2016 establishments in Kerala
Educational institutions established in 2016